Adrana is a village and union council of Jhelum District in the Punjab province of Pakistan. It is part of Sohawa Tehsil.

References 

Populated places in Tehsil Sohawa
Union councils of Sohawa Tehsil 

Villages in Sohawa Tehsil